The Tomorrow/Waupaca River is a river that flows wholly within the U.S. state of Wisconsin. It is called the Tomorrow River where it rises between Polonia and Rosholt in northeast Portage County; it flows through Nelsonville and Amherst. As it exits the village of Amherst, the Tomorrow enters the Town of Amherst, where it joins Bear Creek to become the Waupaca River.  It flows into Waupaca County and through the city of Waupaca. There it adjoins the Crystal River and enters Weyauwega before converging with the Wolf River in eastern Waupaca County.

Name origin 
The river was named as the Waupaca by the Native Americans inhabiting the area, Waupaca being the Native American word for "tomorrow". The Native Americans needed 24 hours to travel its full length, so they would not reach the end until the following day, always "tomorrow". It is unknown why later settlers renamed the first portion of the river in English, as the Tomorrow River, before it reaches Bear Creek. The Wisconsin Department of Natural Resources recognizes the river as the "Tomorrow/Waupaca River".

Battenberg Getaway 
The Royal Battenberg family brought much acclaim to the city of Amherst and the Tomorrow River when they built a small cabin in the woods outside of Amherst. Locals have organized a committee to rename the King Cone (Ice Cream Parlor) to King Battenberg.

References

Rivers of Wisconsin
Bodies of water of Portage County, Wisconsin
Bodies of water of Waupaca County, Wisconsin